The 2015–16 Barangay Ginebra San Miguel season was the 37th season of the franchise in the Philippine Basketball Association (PBA).

Key dates

2015
August 23: The 2015 PBA draft took place in Midtown Atrium, Robinson Place Manila.

Draft picks

Roster

 

  Chua also serves as Barangay Ginebra's board governor.

Philippine Cup

Eliminations

Standings

Game log

|- bgcolor="#edbebf"
| 1
|  October 25
|  Star Hotshots
|  86–78
|   Slaughter (28)
|  Slaughter (16)
|  Thompson (6)
|  Smart Araneta Coliseum
|  0–1
|- bgcolor="#edbebf"
| 2
|  October 31
|  Barako Bull Energy
|  82–79
|  Slaughter (27)
|  Slaughter (26)
|   Slaughter(4)
|  Mall of Asia Arena
|  0–2

|- bgcolor="#cfc"
| 3
|  November 7
|  Alaska Aces
|  93–92
|   Slaughter (27)
|  Slaughter (19)
|  RJ Jazul (10)
|  Al Wasl, Dubai
|  1–2
|- bgcolor="#edbebf"
| 4
|  November 15
|  San Miguel Beermen
|  100–82
|  Arwind Santos (24)
|  Junemar Fajardo (14)
|  Chris Ross (8)
|  Philsports Arena
|  1–3

Bracket

Commissioner's Cup

Eliminations

Standings

Playoffs

Bracket

Governors' Cup

Eliminations

Standings

Bracket

Game log

|- bgcolor="#cfc"
| 1
|  July 16
|  GlobalPort
|  93–81
|   Aguilar (22)
|  Harris (10)
|  Devance (6)
|  Mall of Asia Arena
|  1–0
|- bgcolor=#edbebf
| 2
|  July 24
|  Alaska
|  100–109(OT)
|  
|  
|   
|  Smart Araneta Coliseum
|  1–1
|- bgcolor=#bbffbb
| 3
|  July 27
|  NLEX
|  85–72
|  
|  
|   
|  Smart Araneta Coliseum
|  2–1
|- bgcolor=#bbffbb
| 4
|  July 30
|  Meralco
|  107–93
|  
|  
|   
|  Lucena City
|  3–1
|- bgcolor=#bbffbb

|- bgcolor=#bbffbb
| 5
|  August 10
|  Blackwater
|  107–95
|  
|  
|   
|  Smart Araneta Coliseum
|  4–1
|- bgcolor=#edbebf
| 6
|  August 14
|  San Miguel
|  105–111(2OT)
|  
|  
|   
|  Mall of Asia Arena
|  4–2
|- bgcolor=#bbffbb
| 7
|  August 21
|  Rain Or Shine
|  101–87
|  
|  
|   
|  Smart Araneta Coliseum
|  5–2
|- bgcolor=#bbffbb
| 8
|  August 28
|  Star
|  116–103
|  
|  
|   
|  Smart Araneta Coliseum
|  6–2

|-bgcolor=#bbffbb
| 9
|  September 9
|  Mahindra
|  93–86
|  
|  
|   
|  Smart Araneta Coliseum
|  7–2
|-bgcolor=#bbffbb
| 10
|  September 14
|  Phoenix
|  97–86
|  
|  
|   
|  Ynares Center
|  8–2
|-bgcolor=#edbebf
| 11
|  September 18
|  TNT
|  92–104
|  
|  
|   
|  Laguna
|  8–3

Playoffs

Bracket

Transactions

Trades
Pre-season

Philippine Cup

Recruited imports

References

See also 
 List of Barangay Ginebra San Miguel seasons

Barangay Ginebra San Miguel seasons
Barangay Ginebra